Anton Julian Ferdinand (born 18 February 1985) is an English former footballer who most recently played for St Mirren as a centre back. He was a product of the West Ham United academy and has also played for their senior team, Queens Park Rangers, Sunderland, Bursaspor, Antalyaspor and Reading. He has also played for England at under-21 level. Ferdinand retired from professional football in July 2019.

Background
Ferdinand was born in Peckham, Greater London, to Janice from Ireland and Julian from Saint Lucia. His brother, Rio, played for West Ham United and Manchester United, and is a former captain of the England national football team; and his cousin, Les, is a former England international. Anton showed considerable talent from an early age. Like his brother, Rio, he preferred to play in defence. His ability in this position led to him being signed to West Ham United's academy.

Club career

West Ham United
Ferdinand joined West Ham aged nine signing a three-year contract in the summer of 2002. He was handed his first team debut, by manager Glenn Roeder, in August 2003 when he started the 2–1 victory at Preston North End on the 2003–04 season's opening day. He went on to feature in 26 games that season.

In the 2004–05 season, he cemented his first team place with several key performances including scoring the opening goal, and his first for West Ham, on the final day of the season as West Ham beat Watford 2–1 at Vicarage Road to make the play-offs. In the Final Ferdinand was a member of the team which beat Preston 1–0, earning them promotion back into the Premier League after an absence of two years. At the end of July 2005, Ferdinand signed a three-year contract extension with the club.

Ferdinand won the Premier League Player of the Month award in January 2006, following his brother Rio to become the first brothers to win the award. In the 2006 FA Cup Final against Liverpool in Cardiff, Ferdinand fell to his knees after missing the decisive penalty in the shoot out. During the 2005–06 season, Ferdinand was linked with reigning Spanish champions FC Barcelona.

In March 2007 it was revealed that Ferdinand had been fined two weeks' wages (estimated at £45,000) for lying about his whereabouts. Ferdinand told the club he needed to go to the Isle of Wight to visit his grandmother when in fact, he went to South Carolina to celebrate his 22nd birthday. West Ham lost the following game to relegation rivals Charlton Athletic 0–4. His last goal for West Ham was against Fulham on 12 January 2008, scoring in the 69th minute to put West Ham 2–1 ahead, which proved to be the winning goal.

Sunderland
On 27 August 2008, Ferdinand signed for Sunderland for an undisclosed fee on a four-year deal. Sunderland manager Roy Keane also stated after the signing of Ferdinand that he viewed him as a future England International. Ferdinand made a promising start to his Sunderland career in a partnership formed with Danny Collins but Sunderland's poor results at the start of the 2008–09 season saw Keane experiment with several different back four line-ups resulting in Ferdinand being in and out of the side. Following captain Dean Whitehead's departure to Stoke City in July 2009, Nyron Nosworthy took Whitehead's vacated number 6 jersey and Ferdinand switched from number 26 to number 5. Ferdinand fell out of favour with new manager Steve Bruce and first team opportunities became limited and he was not initially given a squad number for the 2010–11 Premier League season as loan-signing John Mensah was given Ferdinand's number 5 shirt, but was later given number 29.

Queens Park Rangers
On 31 August 2011, Sunderland accepted a bid from Queens Park Rangers for Ferdinand. The transfer was confirmed on 1 September. He made his debut on 12 September, playing the full 90 minutes, alongside Danny Gabbidon in a 0–0 draw with Newcastle United at Loftus Road. On 23 October, in a match between QPR and Chelsea, Ferdinand alleged racial abuse by Chelsea captain, John Terry, claiming Terry called him a "fucking black cunt" during the game; a claim denied by Terry. On 1 November, the Metropolitan Police announced a formal investigation into the allegations. On 1 February 2012 at Westminster Magistrates' Court, Terry was accused of a racially aggravated public order offence in relation to the game at Loftus Road on 23 October. He entered a not-guilty plea and stood trial on 9 July. On 13 July, after a four-day trial, Terry was acquitted. In July, following the court hearing Terry was charged by The Football Association with "using abusive and/or insulting words and/or behaviour towards Ferdinand and which included a reference to colour and/or race contrary to FA Rule E3[2]". In September 2012, after a four-day hearing, he was found guilty, banned for four games and fined £220,000. On 9 August 2013, Ferdinand was released by Queens Park Rangers in an effort to cut costs, the club having been relegated to the Championship.

Loan to Bursaspor

In January 2013, after struggling for a first-team place with QPR, Ferdinand joined Turkish club Bursaspor on loan until the end of the season. Ferdinand played seven games for Bursaspor helping them to fourth place in the 2012–13 Super League and a qualifying position in the 2013–14 Europa League.

Antalyaspor
On 14 August 2013, Ferdinand signed for Turkish team Antalyaspor on a three-year contract. At the end of the 2013–14 season he was released by the club.

Police United
Ferdinand was heavily linked with a move to Police United of the Thai Premier League during the summer of 2014. The next week, he arrived in Bangkok to sign for Police United on 18 June 2014. He and Teeratep Winothai were unveiled as new Police United signings in a press conference on 20 June and he said former QPR teammate Jay Bothroyd, who plays for Muangthong United convinced him to move to Thailand. The BBC later reported that the move had fallen through and that Ferdinand was in advanced negotiations with Championship side Reading with the CEO of Police United, Samrit Bunditkitsada, being part of a consortium which bought a 90% stake in the English club in July.

Reading
On 11 August 2014, Ferdinand signed a two-year deal with Reading on a free transfer. Ferdinand did not make his Reading debut until 4 November 2014. He had been side-lined with a hamstring injury but played the first half in a 3–0 home win against Rotherham United. Reading announced on 9 May 2016, that Ferdinand would leave Reading when his contract expired at the end of June 2016.

Southend United
On 27 August 2016, Ferdinand signed for Southend United on a one-year deal. On 9 August 2017, Ferdinand signed a new two-year contract to stay at Southend United. At the end of the 2017–18 season he was transfer listed by the club. On 31 August 2018, he left the club by mutual consent and became a free agent.

St Mirren
On 14 September 2018, he joined Scottish Premiership side St Mirren. In January 2019, Ferdinand signed a contract extension with St Mirren – keeping him at the club until the end of the season. In May 2019, Ferdinand confirmed that he was leaving Saints at the end of his contract.

International career
Ferdinand was a regular selection for England's Under-21 side, having made his début in a 3–1 win over Ukraine at the Riverside Stadium on 17 August 2004.

Ferdinand was selected to be part of the England squad for the 2007 UEFA European Under-21 Football Championship in the Netherlands, and given the number 5 shirt. Going into the tournament whilst recovering from an injury, he made only one appearance, as substitute, in the semi-final against the hosts. The match finished 1–1 after extra time, and in the penalty shootout which followed, he scored one and missed one as the Netherlands won 13–12. This was his final U21 appearance.

Ferdinand is also eligible to play for the Republic of Ireland national team through his mother, and the St. Lucian national team through his father.

Personal life

Ferdinand is a Christian. He is the brother of former footballer Rio Ferdinand. He is the cousin of Les Ferdinand, a former Queens Park Rangers striker, and Kane Ferdinand, a midfielder for Maidenhead United.

Court case
In October 2006, Ferdinand was arrested on assault charges following a fracas outside a nightclub in Ilford. He was charged in November 2006. He appeared at Snaresbrook Crown Court on 12 November 2007 charged with assault occasioning actual bodily harm and affray, arising from this incident. It was alleged that Ferdinand had punched Emile Walker. In his defence, Ferdinand said he had feared he was going to be robbed of his £64,000 watch and was defending himself. On 20 November 2007, Ferdinand was acquitted as the jury accepted he was acting in self-defence.

Charity work
Ferdinand is an Athlete Ambassador for the charity Right To Play.

Racial abuse 

On 2 November 2011, John Terry was placed under police investigation following an allegation of racist abuse made at Ferdinand during a match versus Queens Park Rangers. Video footage circulated on the internet led to accusations that Terry called Ferdinand a "fucking black cunt." In response to the video footage, Terry claimed that he was actually asking Ferdinand, "Oi, Anton, do you think I called you a black cunt?" On 25 November 2011, Terry was interviewed under caution by the police. On 21 December 2011, he was charged with using racist language by the Crown Prosecution Service. On 3 February 2012, the Football Association stripped Terry of his England captaincy for the second time, stating that Terry would not captain the national team until the racial abuse allegations against him were resolved.

When the trial began in July 2012, Terry entered a not guilty plea and was acquitted of the charge on 13 July 2012. The court established that neither Ferdinand nor anyone else had heard Terry's words, but Terry himself admitted that he had directed the words "fucking black cunt" and "fucking knobhead" at Ferdinand, which was affirmed by two expert lip readers from video evidence. Terry maintained that he used the words as a form of sarcasm and that he was questioning what he thought had been an allegation of racism from Ferdinand; neither lip reader was able to "identify whether the statement was made as a question or in what type of voice it was said." Chief Magistrate Riddle concluded that while there was no doubt Terry had uttered those words in anger, "it is impossible to be sure exactly what were the words spoken by [Terry] at the relevant time" and that there was a lack of evidence to prove beyond a doubt that Terry had used them as an insult instead of "a challenge to what he believed had been said to him." The court therefore found Terry not guilty.

On 27 July 2012, the FA charged Terry for using "abusive and/or insulting words and/or behaviour" which "included a reference to the ethnic origin and/or colour and/or race of Ferdinand." The FA had delayed the charge until after the conclusion of Terry's criminal trial. Terry denied the charge. On the eve of the FA's hearing, Terry announced his retirement from the England national football team, saying his position had become "untenable" due to the disciplinary charge. On 27 September 2012, the hearing concluded with Terry being found guilty; he was punished with a four-match ban and a £220,000 fine.

The FA published a 63-page report regarding the disciplinary proceedings conducted by an Independent Regulatory Commission; it labelled aspects of Terry's defence as "improbable, implausible and contrived," finding it "inherently unlikely that if he had been accused by Mr. Ferdinand of calling him something that ended with the words "black cunt", that Mr. Terry would have added the word "fucking" when he threw the words back, if he was genuinely doing so by way of forceful denial" and "inherently improbable" that he would call Anton Ferdinand a "fucking knobhead" for falsely accusing him of racial abuse. The Commission found it "implausible" that to robustly deny having used the words "black cunt" he "simply repeated" them. His defence in court was not that he had "simply repeated" the words but that he had "sarcastically" repeated them (see above); however, there was no reference to sarcasm in the Regulatory Commission's 63-page written report. The Commission concluded that it was "quite satisfied, on the balance of probabilities, that there [was] no credible basis for Mr. Terry's defence that his use of the words 'fucking black cunt' were directed at Ferdinand by way of forceful rejection and/or inquiry. Instead, [the Commission was] quite satisfied, and [found] on the balance of probabilities, that the offending words were said by way of insult."

The FA commission was also criticised as a "kangaroo court" and the FA for its lack of independence, for failing to disclose all evidence to the police, failing to tape record their interview with key witness Ashley Cole, for lowering the required burden of proof after the incident had taken place, and for punishing Terry for an offence he had already been cleared of in a criminal court, in contravention of its own rules, which state that verdicts in criminal cases are "presumed to be correct" unless "clear and convincing evidence" to the contrary emerges. Terry's four-match ban was contrasted with Luis Suárez's eight-match ban for racially abusing Patrice Evra (Suárez received a longer ban for using the insults repeatedly) and a 14-year-old schoolboy's five-match ban for telling a referee his name was Santa Claus.

On 18 October 2012, Terry decided not to appeal against the verdict and his four-match ban. He issued an apology for "the language [he] used in the game" and stated that it was "not acceptable on the football field or indeed in any walk of life." Chelsea announced that they had taken further disciplinary action against Terry while keeping the details confidential. However, Terry and Chelsea still faced media condemnation; Terry was criticised for not directly and personally apologising to Ferdinand, while Chelsea were accused of hypocrisy and double standards by only fining Terry and not stripping him of his captaincy when they have a "zero-tolerance" approach to racism and had previously handed a life ban to a fan who racially abused former Chelsea player Didier Drogba. In a radio interview, Chelsea chairman Bruce Buck and chief executive Ron Gourlay called the incident a "lapse of judgement" and "out of character" from Terry and stated that the club had "taken firm disciplinary action appropriate to the circumstances," adding that "we must not forget he was cleared in a court of law."

In November 2020, the BBC broadcast Anton Ferdinand: Football, Racism and Me, a programme looking at racism and the incident with Terry in 2011. While promoting the programme on Instagram, Ferdinand received racist abuse by being sent monkey and banana emojis.

Career statistics

Honours
Individual
Premier League Player of the Month: January 2006

West Ham United
Football League Championship play-offs: 2005

References

External links

Guardian Interview
Anton Ferdinand at The Wonderful World of West Ham United statistics

1985 births
Living people
Footballers from Peckham
English footballers
England youth international footballers
England under-21 international footballers
Association football central defenders
West Ham United F.C. players
Sunderland A.F.C. players
Queens Park Rangers F.C. players
Premier League players
English Football League players
English people of Saint Lucian descent
English people of Irish descent
Black British sportsmen
Bursaspor footballers
Expatriate footballers in Turkey
English expatriate footballers
English expatriate sportspeople in Turkey
Süper Lig players
Race and law
Antalyaspor footballers
Reading F.C. players
Southend United F.C. players
Race-related controversies in the United Kingdom
People acquitted of assault
St Mirren F.C. players
Scottish Professional Football League players
English Christians
FA Cup Final players